The 2015 Queensland state election was held on 31 January 2015 to elect all 89 members of the unicameral Legislative Assembly of Queensland.

The centre-right Liberal National Party (LNP), led by Premier Campbell Newman, attempted to win a second term but was defeated by the opposition centre-left Australian Labor Party (ALP), led by Opposition Leader Annastacia Palaszczuk. Labor formed a minority government with the support of the lone independent MP in the chamber, Peter Wellington. It is only the seventh change of government in Queensland since 1915, and only the third time since 1932 that a sitting government in the state has failed to win a second term. Furthermore, Annastacia Palaszczuk became the first woman to win government from opposition in a state election (eventual Chief Minister Clare Martin led the Labor Party to victory from opposition in 2001 at an election in the Northern Territory).

The previous election saw Labor, which had governed the state for all but two years since 1989, suffer the worst defeat of a sitting government in the state's history. The LNP won 78 seats—the largest majority government in Queensland history—compared to seven for Labor, two for Katter's Australian Party, and two won by independents. Following Labor's defeat former Premier Anna Bligh retired from politics and was succeeded as party leader by her former Transport Minister, Palaszczuk. Months later, Ray Hopper left the LNP to lead Katter's Australian Party while two further LNP MPs became independents, resulting in a total of 75 LNP seats, seven Labor seats, three Katter seats and four independent seats. Two by-elections saw Labor defeat the LNP, reducing the LNP to 73 seats with Labor on 9 seats. Although Labor hoped to regain much of what it lost in its severe defeat of three years earlier, most polls pointed to the LNP being returned for another term with a reduced majority.

On election night, the outcome of the election was inconclusive, though most political analysts projected that the LNP had lost its majority after suffering what ended up being a record 14-point two-party swing. Newman was defeated in his seat of Ashgrove to his predecessor, Kate Jones—only the second time since Federation that a sitting Queensland premier has lost their own seat. With the outcome in his own seat beyond doubt, Newman announced his retirement from politics, though remained as caretaker premier pending the final results. According to projections from both ABC News and Brisbane's The Courier-Mail, Labor had taken at least 30 seats from the LNP, and was very close to picking up the 36-seat swing it needed to form government in its own right—a feat initially thought impossible when the writs were issued. On the day after the election, both outlets had Labor either two or three seats short of a majority. Political analysts opined that the balance of power was likely to rest with Katter's Australian Party and independent Wellington.

Wellington announced on 5 February he would support a Palaszczuk-led Labor minority government on confidence and supply while retaining the right to vote on conscience. On 13 February, the Electoral Commission of Queensland declared the results of the election.  Labor won 44 seats, one short of a majority, putting Labor in a position to form a minority government in the hung parliament. Even allowing for the LNP's previously overwhelming majority, the 37-seat swing is the second-largest shift of seats against a sitting government in Queensland since Federation, only exceeded by the 44-seat shift against Labor in 2012. Conversely, the two-party swing of 13.7 points in 2012 was exceeded by the 2015 two-party swing of 14.0 points.

Palaszczuk approached Governor Paul de Jersey on 11 February and advised him that she could form a minority government. Palaszczuk and de Jersey met again on 13 February.  At that meeting, de Jersey formally invited Palaszczuk to form a government, an invitation that Palaszczuk accepted. On 14 February, Palaszczuk was sworn in as the 39th Premier of Queensland.

Results

Seats changing hands

Post-election pendulum

Labor regained power mainly on the strength of recovering much of what it had lost in Brisbane at the 2012 election. Brisbane had been Labor's power base for more than a quarter-century; Labor had gone into the 2012 election holding 36 of the capital's 40 seats, losing all but three at the election.  In 2015, however, Labor won 28 seats in Brisbane. The LNP was still in a position to hope for a minority government primarily by sweeping the Gold Coast, albeit in most cases by somewhat smaller margins than in 2012.

Although Queensland is Australia's least centralised state, since the abolition of the Bjelkemander it has been extremely difficult to form even a minority government without a strong base in Brisbane.  The 2015 election underscored this.  None of the LNP's safe seats (greater than 10 percent 2PP) were located in Brisbane.  The LNP's safest seat, Moggill, only had a majority of 8.2 percent, putting it on the strong side of fairly safe.  In contrast, all but two of Labor's safe seats were in the capital.

Following the election, the Palmer United Party candidate for Ferny Grove, Mark Taverner, was revealed to be an undischarged bankrupt and was therefore ineligible to run. The revelation spurred speculation that there may need to be a by-election to resolve the seat. The Electoral Commission of Queensland initially released a statement on 8 February saying that it would declare the seat, and then refer the issue to the Supreme Court of Queensland sitting as the Court of Disputed Returns. The statement raised a by-election as a possible outcome.

Lawrence Springborg, who succeeded Newman as LNP leader on 7 February, called for the caretaker government to continue until after a possible Ferny Grove by-election is held, citing both the uncertainty of a hung parliament and doubt over the status of Ferny Grove. Conversely, ABC election analyst Antony Green believed that the Ferny Grove outcome and possible by-election would not affect who forms government. Professor Graeme Orr, an electoral law expert at University of Queensland, labelled the prospect of the LNP maintaining a caretaker government until a possible by-election analogous to a "constitutional coup". Orr also reasoned that the law and facts were against a Ferny Grove by-election. The Electoral Commission of Queensland declared Ferny Grove had been won by the Labor candidate Mark Furner over LNP incumbent Dale Shuttleworth on 11 February, signalling that it would soon refer the matter to the Court of Disputed Returns. Green analysed the Ferny Grove tally and concluded that Taverner did not have an effect on the outcome of the election. Specifically, Green concluded that at most, 353 of Taverner's ballot papers had exhausted. However, Furner would have still won even if all of those votes had gone to Shuttleworth had Taverner not been on the ballot. To Green's mind, this made it extremely difficult to argue that exhausted preferences alone would be enough to demand a by-election in Ferny Grove.

On 13 February the Electoral Commission of Queensland stated that, based on legal advice, they would not be referring the Ferny Grove result to the Court of Disputed Returns. This formally cleared the way for a Labor minority government, and Governor Paul de Jersey invited Palaszczuk to form a government later that day. The LNP stated they were considering their legal options, with Springborg later releasing a statement where he "congratulate[d] incoming Premier Annastacia Palaszczuk and her government". On 16 February the LNP announced it would not be challenging the Ferny Grove result.

Voting method
Queensland used an optional preferential version of the instant-runoff system in single-member electorates, in 2016 compulsory preferential voting was readopted. The election was conducted by the Electoral Commission of Queensland, an independent body answerable to Parliament. In Queensland, a parliamentary term was for a maximum of three years, measured from the day set for the return of the electoral writs, as a result of the 2016 referendum in future Queensland will have fixed four-year terms. The previous state election was held on 24 March 2012.

Date
Section 80 of the Queensland Electoral Act 1992 states that an election must be held on a Saturday, and that the election campaign must run for a minimum of 26 or a maximum of 56 days following the issue of the writs including the day the writ drops and polling day. Five to seven days following the issue of the writs, the electoral roll is closed, which gives voters a final opportunity to enrol or to notify the Electoral Commission of Queensland of any changes in their place of residence.

The Constitution Act Amendment Act 1890 provides that the Legislative Assembly continues for no more than three years from the day set for the return of writs for the previous election, after which time the Legislative Assembly expires. The day set for the return of writs for the 2012 election was 23 April 2012. The Electoral Act requires the Governor to issue writs for a general election no more than four days after the Legislative Assembly is dissolved or expires. The last possible day for the next election is therefore a Saturday not more than 56 days beyond four days after the expiry of the Legislative Assembly on 23 April 2015, namely, 20 June 2015.

Under current election rules, the date of the election is at the discretion of the Governor under advice from the Premier, although the leaders of the two largest parties support in principle a change to fixed four-year terms.

On 5 January 2015, media organisations reported that Newman intended to announce the election date the next day. On 6 January, Newman confirmed on Twitter that he had visited acting governor Tim Carmody and writs had been issued for an election on 31 January. This was the first time in over a century that an Australian general election was held in January. The last January election was held in Tasmania in 1913 and the last on the mainland was the New South Wales colonial election of 1874–75.

The election was held on the same day as the 2015 Davenport state by-election in South Australia.

Key dates

Contesting parties 
Besides the ALP and LNP, the election was contested by The Greens, Family First, Katter's Australian Party, One Nation and the Palmer United Party.

Last election 

The last state election to be held was the 2012 Queensland state election where the Australian Labor Party led by Premier Anna Bligh attempted to win a second term as Premier in her own right and a third term overall and a sixth consecutive term in office. Opposing her was the Liberal National Party led by Campbell Newman. The election was the second for Bligh who had succeeded Peter Beattie as Premier in 2007. Newman was the former Lord Mayor of Brisbane from 2004 to 2011, having resigned the position to run for Premier.

As Newman did not have a seat in state parliament, he chose to contest preselection in the seat of Ashgrove for the 2012 election, and lead the party from outside of parliament until the election. Jeff Seeney served as Opposition Leader in the parliament.

The Labor Party went into the election with a modest margin with 51 seats, while the Liberal National Party had 32 seats. Labor was defeated in an historic landslide, the LNP winning 78 seats to just seven for Labor, with Newman winning of Ashgrove from the former Environment Minister, Kate Jones.
 
Aidan McLindon, the parliamentary leader of the Katter's Australia Party, lost his seat of Beaudesert, but the KAP won two seats. Only two of the independent members were re-elected.

Three by-elections occurred after the 2012 state election. Labor candidate Yvette D'Ath won the 2014 Redcliffe by-election in February, and Labor candidate Anthony Lynham won the 2014 Stafford by-election in July. Jackie Trad held Bligh's former seat of South Brisbane of Labor in an April 2012 by-election, following Bligh's resignation from parliament.

Pre-election pendulum

Following the 2012 election, Ray Hopper left the LNP to lead Katter's Australian Party while two further LNP MPs became independents (Carl Judge in the electorate of Yeerongpilly and Dr Alex Douglas in the electorate of Gaven), resulting in a total of 75 LNP seats, seven Labor seats, three Katter seats and four independent seats. By-elections in Redcliffe and Stafford saw Labor defeat the LNP, reducing the LNP to 73 seats with Labor on 9 seats.

Retiring MPs

Members who were deselected or who chose not to renominate were as follows:

Labor
 Tim Mulherin (Mackay) – announced 9 January 2015
 Desley Scott (Woodridge) – announced 11 March 2014

LNP
 Peter Dowling (Redlands) – deselected 25 October 2014
 Bruce Flegg (Moggill) – deselected 7 December 2014
 David Gibson (Gympie) – announced 2 May 2014
 Howard Hobbs (Warrego) – announced 5 September 2014
 Vaughan Johnson (Gregory) – announced 2 October 2014
 Ted Malone (Mirani) – announced 26 September 2014
 Rosemary Menkens (Burdekin) – announced 19 September 2014

Independent
 Liz Cunningham (Gladstone) – announced 6 January 2015

Polling

Primary vote opinion polling graph

Two-party preferred opinion polling graph

Voting intention

Better Premier

Approval ratings

Polling conducted by Newspoll and published in The Australian is conducted via random telephone number selection in city and country areas. Sampling sizes usually consist of around 1100–1200 electors. The declared margin of error is ±3 percentage points.

See also 

Candidates of the 2015 Queensland state election
Members of the Queensland Legislative Assembly, 2015–2018
Politics of Queensland

References

External links
2015 State General Election – Electoral Commission Queensland
2015 Queensland election – Antony Green ABC

Elections in Queensland
2015 elections in Australia
2010s in Queensland
January 2015 events in Australia